Carlo Franchi may refer to:

Carlo Franchi (composer) (1743–1779), Italian composer
Carlo Franchi (born 1938), Italian racing driver, known as Gimax